An Andorran passport is an identity document issued to Andorran citizens for international travel.

Although citizens of Andorra are not EU citizens, they can nonetheless use the lanes for EU and EFTA citizens when crossing the external borders of the Schengen Area instead of using the desks for third-country nationals.

Visa requirements

Visa requirements for Andorran citizens are administrative entry restrictions imposed by the authorities of other states. As of 1 January 2017, Andorran citizens had visa-free or visa on arrival access to 155 countries and territories, ranking the Andorran passport 19th in terms of travel freedom (tied with the San Marino passport) according to the Henley visa restrictions index.

See also
Visa requirements for Andorran citizens

References

External links 
 Application form for an Andorran passport
 Gallery of Andorran passports

Andorra
Government of Andorra